Kyle Stephen Joel Ebecilio (born 17 February 1994) is a Dutch professional footballer who plays for Cypriot Second Division club Alki Oroklini. Ebecilio, who plays as a midfielder, has featured for Arsenal, Nottingham Forest as well as Eredivisie sides ADO Den Haag and FC Twente throughout his career.

Club career

Arsenal
Born in Rotterdam, Netherlands, Ebecilio started his youth career at Feyenoord when he was seven. Ebecilio soon attracted interest from Premier League clubs and eventually joined Arsenal in 2010. In 2011, Ebecilio signed his first professional contract with the club. In November 2011, Ebecilio felt it was time for him to make his breakthrough at Arsenal. While at Arsenal, Ebecilio helped the club to reach to fourth place of the 2012–13 NextGen Series.

In May 2013, Ebecilio was offered a new contract with the club after years at the club's academy. Meanwhile, other clubs were interested in signing Ebecilio.

Twente
In May 2013, Ebecilio signed a five-year contract with FC Twente, returning to his homeland after three years in England.

Ebecilio made his professional debut on 3 August 2013, coming on as a substitute for Dario Tanda in the 60th minutes, in a 0–0 draw against RKC Waalwijk. Ebecilio scored his first professional goal in the next game, in a 4–1 win over Feyenoord. Later in his first season, having been ever-present in this season, Ebecilio scored six more goals against Heracles, NAC Breda, PSV Eindhoven, Roda JC Kerkrade, N.E.C. and PEC Zwolle.

In his second season at Twente, Ebecilio added two more goals against Utrecht on 28 September 2013 and AZ Alkmaar on 5 October 2014. In December 2014, Ebecilio clashed with Manager Alfred Schreuder resulting in him being left out of the squad for four matches. Ebecilio scored on his return, in a 2–1 win over Cambuur on 31 January 2015.

Nottingham Forest
On 20 August 2015, Ebecilio joined Championship side Nottingham Forest on a season-long loan. He made his debut in a 1–1 draw away at Bolton Wanderers on 22 August 2015. However, having made only five first-team appearances for the club due to injury, Ebecilio's loan deal at Nottingham was terminated on 31 January 2016; the last day of the English and Dutch winter transfer window. He was instantly loaned out to ADO Den Haag where he stayed for the remaining duration of that season.

Return to Twente
Ebecilio then returned to FC Twente in the summer of 2016. He was not featured by the Tukkers as a regular player for the first side. Ebecilio thus left the club in March 2017.

NEC
Ebecilio signed up with N.E.C in November 2017 where at first he sought to regain his fitness. Ebecilio was eventually added to the squad of Jong N.E.C. in late January 2018.

ADO Den Haag
In December 2018 Ebecilio moved back to ADO Den Haag to regain his fitness. His first game upon his return to the club was for Jong ADO when he came on in the 76th minute against  Sparta Rotterdam, replacing midfielder Johnny Reynolds in a 2-1 win. He played seven further matches with Jong ADO in Beloften Eredivisie. On 21 April 2019 he was added to the selection of the first team who played against PSV Eindhoven but he stayed on the bench.  He made his return to the first team as a late substitute for Danny Bakker in a 6-2 win against Willem II on 15th May 2019.  It was his final appearance for the club.

Excelsior 
In July 2019, he moved to Excelsior on a two-year contract, but left at the end of the 2019-20 season after only six appearances in the league.

Alki Oroklini 
In January 2021, Ebecilio joined Cypriot Second Division club Alki Oroklini.

International career
Ebecilio has represented The Netherlands at various youth levels, from the under 16 to under 21 teams.

At the UEFA European Under-17 Championship in Serbia, Ebecilio scored three goals in the 2011 tournament which the Dutch won for the first time. He stood out earning the Golden Boot and Best Player awards.

Personal life
Ebecilio grew up supporting Feyenoord and his cousins are fellow footballers Jeffrey Bruma and Marciano Bruma.

Career statistics

Honours

Club
Arsenal
NextGen Series: fourth 2012–13

International
Netherlands
UEFA European Under-17 Championship: 2011

Individual
2011 UEFA European Under-17 Championship
Top Scorer
Best Player

References

External links
 Voetbal International profile 
 Netherlands U21 stats at OnsOranje

1994 births
Living people
Footballers from Rotterdam
Dutch sportspeople of Surinamese descent
Association football midfielders
Dutch footballers
Netherlands youth international footballers
Netherlands under-21 international footballers
Arsenal F.C. players
FC Twente players
Nottingham Forest F.C. players
ADO Den Haag players
Excelsior Rotterdam players
Alki Oroklini players
Eredivisie players
English Football League players
Eerste Divisie players
Cypriot Second Division players
Dutch expatriate footballers
Expatriate footballers in England
Expatriate footballers in Cyprus
Dutch expatriate sportspeople in England
Dutch expatriate sportspeople in Cyprus
Jong FC Twente players